Muhammad Saeed Khawar (born 14 August 1966) better known by his pen name, Saeed Bhutta, is a prominent oral historian of the Punjab in Pakistan. He currently serving as Professor of Punjabi language and literature at Oriental College, University of the Punjab, Lahore, Pakistan. He has published numerous books of folktales, folklore, and folksongs. His research papers have been published in scholarly journals.
He received his M.A. from University of the Punjab, Lahore. Before Joining University of the Punjab as lecturer in 1994, he served as a research scholar at Pakistan Punjabi Adbi Board, Lahore. At the Board, he benefitted from the supervision of Muhammad Asif Khan, a renowned linguist, researcher and critic of Punjabi literature.

Biography and books
Born on 14 of August, 1966 in Pipple Bhutta, a small village in Chiniot, Jhang district, Punjab to Mian Muhammad Bukhsh. He received his Ph.D from the University of the Punjab in 2003. His research interests included pre-colonial Punjab, oral history, culture and language of the Punjab. His primary contribution was in the field of folk literature. Many volumes of  folktales collected, compiled, and edited by him were published during the last two decades.  Literary critics positively reviewed his collections of folk stories entitled Kamal Kahani, Nabar Kahani, Bar Kahani and Raj Kahani. His early works included edited volumes of critical essays Sanjh Wichar and Sanjh Surat.

Career
In March 2010, Saeed Bhutta was selected as Professor of Punjabi at Oriental College University of the Punjab Lahore. Bhutta lately focused his research work on legends and epics of Punjab and published the first volume of his work in this series entitled ‘Des Diyan Vaaran’. Earlier, he had  edited a book of folksongs which were collected during his field research from Chiniot district. He has also written short fiction and has published a collection of short stories.

His important contribution had been in the field of folk literature. His research highlighted the resistance of residents of Punjab against European, Central Asian and Middle Eastern invaders. Contrary to the so-called scholarship of the western Punjab, he brought to light the secular culture of the Punjab and its distinctive features like resistance, hospitality and social justice.

Unlike the imagined picture of the Punjab portrayed in the  Persian and English writings, the folk tales collected as a result of his field work depicted a different character and culture of Punjab. In the folktales collected by him, one finds the sensation of sharing a  sophisticated culture and a higher level of commitment to the cause of social justice  displayed by characters.

Most of writings on pre-colonial Punjab were in Persian and published from Delhi, Lahore, and Multan. In those writings,  references to Bars of Punjab (areas between rivers of Punjab) and Punjabi folk literature were conspicuous by their absence.   Because of a particular tradition of history writing promoted by foreign rulers, it became important to  have a closer look at Punjab's culture, identity, and value system in the light of  primary sources like folktales, folklore and oral history.

Bhutta has opened a new door for sociologists and historians of Punjab by introducing them to a new wealth of authentic material on social structure and value system of  pre-colonial Punjab. His research findings have made it possible for us to break into the Punjab of medieval ages from natives’ point of view. His research work on folk literature of Punjab has added an altogether new dimension to the anthropological, sociological, historical and cultural studies of pre-colonial Punjab.
He is devoted to his culture and this motivates him to work on the classical poetry, Folklore, Varan and the oral literature of Jhang. He has introduced many prominent personalities of Jhang and has highlighted their achievements. His works are regularly published in Pakistan and abroad. He is the son of the soil in true sense.

In Punjab, and among the circles of Punjabi academia, these folk tales have been reviewed as a major contribution to the cultural studies of Punjab. The fascinating language of  these  folk tales had a positive  impact on contemporary Punjabi fiction and poetry. Many contemporary creative minds found it natural to express themselves in the diction and the idiom that had roots in the collective memory of the land and was preserved by Saeed Bhutta in such a professional manner.
He has supervised 11 Doctorate theses, and almost 50 theses of Master of Punjabi are written under his supervision. His more than 40 research articles are published in renowned local and international Journals of Punjabi language and literature and 20 in the HEC's(Higher Education Commission of Pakistan) approved research Journals. He is also included in the list of approved PhD supervisors of HEC Islamabad, Pakistan.

References

Links 
Biography at Punjab University
https://archive.org/search.php?query=saeed%20bhutta
http://pu.edu.pk/images/cv/1349847518C.V.%20Dr.%20Saeed%20%20Khawar%20Bhutta.pdf

Living people
1966 births
Oral historians